Remus Traian Ganea (born 17 September 1972) is a Romanian former professional footballer who played as a left-back. After his retirement, Ganea was the president of Bihorul Beiuș, the club from his hometown, from 2008 until 2014, then the president of the sport club.

References

External links
 

1972 births
Living people
People from Beiuș
Romanian footballers
Association football defenders
Liga I players
Liga II players
FC Bihor Oradea players
FC U Craiova 1948 players
FC UTA Arad players
FC Progresul București players
CSM Unirea Alba Iulia players
FC Astra Giurgiu players
FC Argeș Pitești players
Nemzeti Bajnokság I players
Diósgyőri VTK players
Romanian expatriate footballers
Expatriate footballers in Hungary
Romanian expatriate sportspeople in Hungary